The 2012 NCAA Division I FCS football season, part of college football in the United States, was organized by the National Collegiate Athletic Association (NCAA) at the Division I Football Championship Subdivision (FCS) level. The season began on August 30, 2012, and concluded with the 2013 NCAA Division I Football Championship Game on January 5, 2013, at FC Dallas Stadium in Frisco, Texas.

Conference changes

Several teams changed conferences from the 2011 season. Texas State of the Southland Conference (but technically played as an independent in 2011), Massachusetts of the Colonial Athletic Association (CAA) and independents South Alabama and UTSA are transitioning to the Football Bowl Subdivision and were transitional FBS members in 2012; all four will were to become full FBS members in 2013.

The Great West Conference dropped football after all of its five football members in the 2011 season joined other conferences. Cal Poly, North Dakota, Southern Utah and UC Davis all joined the Big Sky Conference. South Dakota joined the Missouri Valley Football Conference.

In their third year as a program, Georgia State, already a full member of the CAA, joined the football conference after two years as an independent. However, this was the Panthers' only season as a CAA football member, as the school has announced that it would begin an FBS transition in 2012 in advance of its July 2013 move to the Sun Belt Conference.

There were no teams playing as independents in 2012.

FCS team wins over FBS teams
 August 30:
 Eastern Washington 20, Idaho 3
 McNeese State 27, Middle Tennessee 21
 September 1:
 Tennessee–Martin 20, Memphis 17
 Youngstown State 31, Pittsburgh 17
 September 8:
 Illinois State 31, Eastern Michigan 14
 North Dakota State 22, Colorado State 7
 Northern Arizona 17, UNLV 14
 Sacramento State 30, Colorado 28
 September 15:
 Cal Poly 24, Wyoming 22
 September 29:
 Stony Brook 23, Army 3

Conference standings

Conference summaries

Championship games

Other conference winners

Note: Records are regular-season only, and do not include playoff games.

Playoff qualifiers

Automatic berths for conference champions
Big Sky Conference – Eastern Washington 
Big South Conference – Coastal Carolina
Colonial Athletic Association – Villanova
Mid-Eastern Athletic Conference – Bethune-Cookman
Missouri Valley Football Conference – North Dakota State 
Northeast Conference – Wagner 
Ohio Valley Conference – Eastern Illinois
Patriot League – Colgate
Southern Conference – Georgia Southern
Southland Conference – Central Arkansas

At large qualifiers
Big Sky Conference - Montana State and Cal Poly
Big South Conference - Stony Brook
Colonial Athletic Association - New Hampshire and Old Dominion
Missouri Valley Football Conference - Illinois State and South Dakota State
Southern Conference - Wofford and Appalachian State
Southland Conference - Sam Houston State

Abstains
Ivy League – Penn
Southwestern Athletic Conference – Arkansas–Pine Bluff

Postseason

NCAA Division I playoff bracket

* Home team    † Overtime

Coaching changes

Preseason and in-season
This is restricted to coaching changes that took place on or after May 1, 2012. For coaching changes that occurred earlier in 2012, see 2011 NCAA Division I FCS end-of-season coaching changes.

End of season

 In addition to the above changes, Southern named its interim head coach Dawson Odums as permanent head coach on December 14.

See also

 2012 NCAA Division I FCS football rankings

References